Lalsk is an urban locality (an urban-type settlement) in Luzsky District of Kirov Oblast, Russia, located  northeast from Luza, the administrative center of the district. Population:

History
It takes its name from the Lala River, a tributary of the Luza. The settlement was established by the Novgorodians fleeing east from Ivan the Terrible after the Massacre of Novgorod. It was a large trading outpost in the eastern part of the Russian North in the late 17th and 18th centuries. The earliest stone church was consecrated in 1711.

Lalsk had town status between 1779 and 1927 and served as the administrative center of Lalsky District between 1924 and 1963.

Architecture
Lalsk is notable for a remarkable cluster of 18th-century Orthodox churches in various stages of disrepair:
The Cathedral of Christ's Resurrection (1698-1715) with a campanile dating from 1729
The nearby Church of the Annunciation for winter services (1732-1762)
The partly ruined Church of the Epiphany (1711)
The Church of St. John the Baptist (1714)
The Church of the Savior's Transfiguration (1730-1732)
The Church of the Virgin's Dormition (1791-1796)

References

Urban-type settlements in Kirov Oblast
Vologda Governorate
Populated places established in 1570
Former cities in Russia
1570 establishments in Russia